Senhit Zadik Zadik (born 1 October 1979), known professionally as simply Senhit (formerly written as Senit), is an Italian singer. She represented San Marino in the Eurovision Song Contest 2011 in Düsseldorf with "Stand By", but failed to qualify for the final. She would have represented it again in 2020 with "Freaky!", but the contest was cancelled due to the COVID-19 pandemic. Instead, she was chosen to represent San Marino at the Eurovision Song Contest 2021 with the song "Adrenalina", where she qualified to the final and placed 22nd with 50 points.

Biography
Senhit was born and raised in Bologna, Italy, to Eritrean parents. She started her career abroad. She performed in musicals like Fame, The Lion King and Hair in Switzerland and Germany.

In 2002, she returned to Italy and began her climb to fame in the Italian music business releasing her debut album the self-titled Senit  in 2006 and her second album Un tesoro è necessariamente nascosto in 2007 with the three singles "La mia città è cambiata", "La cosa giusta" and "La faccia che ho". In 2009, Senhit released her third album, the English language So High. Three more singles were released off of the record: "Work Hard", "No More" and "Party on the Dance Floor".

Following her Eurovision participation in 2011, she released a new pop single, "Through the Rain", on 22 June 2011. In April 2012, Senhit released her single "AOK" in the United States. During 2014 Senhit was a permanent guest on the Canale 5 Sunday show Domenica Live, choosing to be called Senhit to mark the new chapter of her career.

Eurovision Song Contest

Senhit represented San Marino in the Eurovision Song Contest 2011 that was held in Düsseldorf with the song "Stand By". The song placed 16th out of 19 in one of the Semi-Finals, and as a result, it did not qualify for the final.

She would have represented San Marino again at the Eurovision Song Contest 2020 in Rotterdam with the song "Freaky!". However, the contest was cancelled due to the COVID-19 pandemic.

Senhit represented San Marino again at the Eurovision Song Contest 2021 with a new song, "Adrenalina". The official music video featured a rap section by the American artist Flo Rida. However, Team San Marino behind the entry declared that "Flo Rida has been part of the production and is featured in the music video, but it's yet to be decided if he will take part on stage in Rotterdam. The rap part will either way remain."  On 18 May 2021, ahead of the first semi-final, the San Marino delegation confirmed that Flo Rida would be joining Senhit on stage in Rotterdam. San Marino was the first country to perform in the second semi-final of the contest, where they finished 9th place with 118 points, qualifying the country for the final. In the final, held on 22 May 2021, they were the last to perform, and finished 22nd with 50 points.

Freaky Trip to Rotterdam
Leading up to her participation in Eurovision 2021, Senhit released monthly covers of previous winning and non-winning Eurovision songs as part of her #FreakyTripToRotterdam series, giving them new interpretations and perspective in collaboration with Luca Tomassini who directed the videos. The series ran from July 2020 to May 2021. The 11-song collection included:

After the contest, Senhit released one more #FreakyTripToRotterdam video, featuring her entry "Adrenalina". The video showed her adventures through Rotterdam, and behind the scenes material from her time at the contest.

Discography

Albums

Extended plays

Singles

References

External links
Senhit Official Website

1979 births
Living people
Eurovision Song Contest entrants of 2011
Eurovision Song Contest entrants of 2020
Italian people of Eritrean descent
Musicians from Bologna
Italian LGBT rights activists
Eurovision Song Contest entrants for San Marino
21st-century Italian singers
21st-century Italian women singers
Eurovision Song Contest entrants of 2021